The 2004 NHK Trophy was the third event of six in the 2004–05 ISU Grand Prix of Figure Skating, a senior-level international invitational competition series. It was held at the Rainbow Ice Arena in Nagoya on November 4–7. Medals were awarded in the disciplines of men's singles, ladies' singles, pair skating, and ice dancing. Skaters earned points toward qualifying for the 2004–05 Grand Prix Final. The compulsory dance was the Midnight Blues.

Results

Men

Ladies

Pairs

Ice dancing

External links

 NHK Trophy 2004
 Official site 

Nhk Trophy, 2004
NHK Trophy